Nahr-e Gabin-e Olya (also Romanized as Nahr-e Gabīn-e ‘Olyā; also known as Nahr-e Gabīn) is a village in Abshar Rural District, in the Central District of Shadegan County, Khuzestan Province, Iran. At the 2006 census, its population was 79, in 11 families.

References 

Populated places in Shadegan County